A total solar eclipse took place at the Moon's descending node of the orbit on March 8–9, 2016. If viewed from east of the International Date Line (for instance from Hawaii), the eclipse took place on March 8 (Tuesday) (local time) and elsewhere on March 9 (Wednesday). A total solar eclipse occurs when the Moon's apparent diameter is larger than the Sun's and the apparent path of the Sun and Moon intersect, blocking all direct sunlight and turning daylight into darkness; the sun appears to be black with a halo around it. Totality occurs in a narrow path across Earth's surface, with the partial solar eclipse visible over a surrounding region thousands of kilometres wide. The eclipse of March 8–9, 2016 had a magnitude of 1.0450 visible across an area of Pacific Ocean, which started in the Indian Ocean, and ended in the northern Pacific Ocean.

It was the 52nd eclipse of the 130th Saros cycle, which began with a partial eclipse on August 20, 1059, and will conclude with a partial eclipse on October 25, 2394.

The eclipse was clearly visible in many parts of Indonesia, including Central Sulawesi and Ternate, but obscured by clouds and smokes in Palembang, the largest city on the path of totality. The eclipse coincided with Nyepi, a public holiday in Indonesia and the end of the Balinese saka calendar. Because Nyepi is normally a day of silence, Muslims in Bali had to be given special dispensation to attend special prayer services during the eclipse.

Path of the eclipse 

On March 9, 2016, a large area of the Pacific, covering Indonesia, Borneo, but also large parts of Southeast Asia and Australia, witnessed a partial solar eclipse. It was total in multiple islands of Indonesia, three atolls of the Federated States of Micronesia (Eauripik, Woleai and Ifalik) and the central Pacific, starting at sunrise over Sumatra and ending at sunset north of Hawaii. In the Eastern Pacific Ocean, the totality exceeded a duration of more than 4 minutes.

In most parts of India and Nepal, the sunrise was partially eclipsed, and much of East Asia witnessed more than 50% partial eclipse.

In order to watch the total solar eclipse, Alaska Airlines adjusted the flight plan for Flight 870.

Maps

Gallery

Related eclipses

Tzolkinex 
 Preceded: Solar eclipse of January 26, 2009
 Followed: Solar eclipse of April 20, 2023

Half-Saros cycle 
 Preceded: Lunar eclipse of March 3, 2007
 Followed: Lunar eclipse of March 14, 2025

Tritos 
 Preceded: Solar eclipse of April 8, 2005
 Followed: Solar eclipse of February 6, 2027

Solar Saros 130 
 Preceded: Solar eclipse of February 26, 1998
 Followed: Solar eclipse of March 20, 2034

Inex 
 Preceded: Solar eclipse of March 29, 1987
 Followed: Solar eclipse of February 16, 2045

Triad 
 Preceded: Solar eclipse of May 9, 1929
 Followed: Solar eclipse of January 8, 2103

This solar eclipse is related to other eclipses including in the current set predictions between 2015 and 2018. It is also a part of long period Saros cycle 130, and a 19-year Metonic cycle.

Eclipses of 2016 
 A total solar eclipse on March 9.
 A penumbral lunar eclipse on March 23.
 A penumbral lunar eclipse on August 18.
 An annular solar eclipse on September 1.
 A penumbral lunar eclipse on September 16.

Solar eclipses descending node 2015-2018 

 Saros 120: Total Solar Eclipse March 20, 2015
 Saros 130: Total Solar Eclipse March 8–9, 2016
 Saros 140: Annular Solar Eclipse February 26, 2017
 Saros 150: Partial Solar Eclipse February 15, 2018

Solar eclipses 2015–18

Saros 130
This eclipse is a part of Saros cycle 130, repeating every 18 years, 11 days, containing 73 events. The series started with partial solar eclipse on August 20, 1096. It contains total eclipses from April 5, 1475, through July 18, 2232. The series ends at member 73 as a partial eclipse on October 25, 2394. The longest duration of totality was 6 minutes, 41 seconds on July 11, 1619.

Metonic series

Notes

References 

 F. Espenak, J. Meeus: Five Millennium Catalog of Solar eclipses, NASA/TP-2009-213174
 
 hermit.org: Total Solar Eclipse: March 9 2016
 Interactive map of the eclipse with local circumstances and diagram
 EU project Stars4All: Eclipse online broadcast from Palu (Indonesia)

External links 
 High-resolution animation of eclipse shadow by Seán Doran from JAXA's Himawari imagery

2016 in Asia
2016 in science
2016 3 9
2016 3 9
March 2016 events
2016 in Indonesia